Miguel Ángel Alba Díaz (born January 23, 1951, in Monterrey, Nuevo León, Mexico), Bishop of the Diocese of La Paz, Baja California Sur, was born in Monterrey, Nuevo León, Mexico on January 23, 1951.

Biography
He studied humanities, philosophy and theology in the seminary of his native city. He was then ordained a priest in Monterrey, Nuevo León, Mexico, on May 31, 1975. He was appointed titular bishop of Fessei and auxiliar bishop for the Archdiocese of Oaxaca by Pope John Paul II on June 10, 1995, and consecrated on July 25, in a ceremony presided over by Archbishop Adolfo Antonio Suárez Rivera.

Pope John Paul II appointed him the third bishop of the Diocese of La Paz, Baja California Sur on July 16, 2001, and took possession the same year.

References

External links

Conferencia del Episcopado Mexicano. Miguel Ángel Alba Díaz biography
Catholic-Hierarchy.net data

1951 births
Living people
Mexican Roman Catholic priests
21st-century Roman Catholic bishops in Mexico
Clergy from Monterrey